Danny Wood Evins (October 11, 1935 – January 14, 2012) was an American entrepreneur and co-founder of Cracker Barrel, a Southern-themed restaurant chain.

Early life
Evins was born in Smithville, Tennessee, on October 11, 1935. As a child he graduated from Castle Heights Military Academy in Lebanon, Tennessee. He enlisted in the US Army, served in Korea in the Corps of Engineers and attended Auburn University.

Career
Evins also worked as an aide for his uncle, U.S. Rep. Joe L. Evins, before taking a position with his family's oil company.

Evins co-founded Cracker Barrel in 1969 while he was working for Shell Oil. He opened the first restaurant in Lebanon, Tennessee, on Tennessee State Route 109. He borrowed $40,000 to construct the first Cracker Barrel, which turned a profit just one month after opening.

Evins was the chief executive officer (CEO) of Cracker Barrel from its founding in 1969 to 2001, and after a shareholder exodus due to his discriminatory policies, he was chairman of the board from 2001 until his retirement in 2004. During this time he was also served as chairman of the board of directors for Castle Heights Military Academy while his son was enrolled in the school.

In 1998, Evans led the drive by Cracker Barrel to purchase and restore the Mitchell House in Lebanon, Tennessee.  The home had been a dormitory for elementary age students while Castle Heights Military Academy had been operating.  The company spent two million dollars to restore the home and make it the company's corporate office.

Discriminatory views and termination
During the early 1990s, Cracker Barrel became the subject of nationwide controversy when Evins personally  instituted an official company policy of discrimination, prohibiting the hiring of any individual whose "sexual preferences fail to demonstrate normal heterosexual values." Following massive public backlash and large shareholders such as the New York City Employee Retirement System threatening to vote out the entirety of upper management, the company reversed the policy.

For the next decade, Evins continued to spark controversy through his public and private encouragement of discriminatory practices against female and minority employees, practices which violated the company's own non-discrimination policy.

In July 2001, shareholders stripped Evins of his position as president and CEO of the company, replacing him with Michael A. Woodhouse, who at the time was serving as the company's chief operating officer. Evins was allowed to maintain his position as chairman of the board. The same year, shareholders forced the company's board to vote unanimously to add sexual orientation to Cracker Barrel's non-discrimination policy, with the term officially being added the following year.

In May 2004, the U.S. Department of Justice (USDOJ) announced it had settled a lawsuit alleging that Cracker Barrel employees at approximately 50 of the company's 500 locations discriminated against minority customers, including 50 stores located in Alabama, Georgia, Louisiana, Mississippi, North Carolina, Tennessee, and Virginia that engaged in various discriminatory policies including racially segregated seating and service quality. In the settlement agreement Cracker Barrel pledged to implement a series of changes, including to strengthen and make public the company's non-discrimination policies, retrain and/or terminate employees in violation of the new policies, and pledged to focus on improving minority representation and civic involvement.

A few months following the announcement, the company's board of directors (with the backing of shareholders), quietly voted to adopt a mandatory retirement age of 70 for all Cracker Barrel executives and board members. The implementation of this rule prompted company founder Evins, who was 69 at the time, to announce his retirement as chairman of the company's board. At the company's 2004 annual meeting, shareholders voted to reelect Michael A. Woodhouse as CEO, while also granting him Evins' title as chairman of the board, effectively merging the roles.

By January 2012, Cracker Barrel had more than 67,000 employees working in more than 600 restaurants in 42 U.S. states.

Personal life
On January 14, 2012, Evins died from bladder cancer at his daughter's home in Lebanon, Tennessee, at the age of 76.

References

1935 births
2012 deaths
American company founders
Businesspeople from Tennessee
Shell plc people
American chief executives of food industry companies
American chairpersons of corporations
Auburn University alumni
Deaths from cancer in Tennessee
Deaths from bladder cancer
20th-century American businesspeople
People from Smithville, Tennessee
People from Lebanon, Tennessee